Giuseppe Agostinone (born 6 April 1988) is an Italian footballer who plays as a defender for  club Sambenedettese.

Career
Agostinone started his career in local Foggia, where he played more than 100 third-and fourth-tier matches. He was loaned several times to smaller teams like Martina Franca, Pro Vercelli and Montichiari, before he left his hometown and signed to Piacenza in 2016. He spent half year in Lecce, then another half year in the Virtus Francavilla, before Alessandria signed him.

On 31 January 2020 Agostinone signed with Lecco.

On 9 October 2020, he returned to Foggia.

In September 2021, he moved to Novara.

On 11 August 2022, Agostinone joined Sambenedettese in Serie D.

References

Sources
 
 

1988 births
Living people
Sportspeople from Foggia
Footballers from Apulia
Association football defenders
Italian footballers
Serie C players
Lega Pro Seconda Divisione players 
Serie D players
Calcio Foggia 1920 players
A.S. Martina Franca 1947 players
F.C. Pro Vercelli 1892 players
A.C. Montichiari players
Piacenza Calcio 1919 players
U.S. Lecce players
Virtus Francavilla Calcio players
U.S. Alessandria Calcio 1912 players
Calcio Lecco 1912 players
Novara F.C. players
A.S. Sambenedettese players